The United Nations Association of Sri Lanka is the leading independent policy authority on the United Nations in Sri Lanka and a Sri Lanka-wide grassroots membership organisation.

Programme of work

History

UNA members 
The UNA-Sri Lanka, as a grassroots membership organisation, has a large network of volunteer-run branches which give individuals across Sri Lanka a chance to partake in UN activities. These range from speaker to fundraising events, these activities raise awareness and interest in the work of the United Nations at a local level across the country.

See also 
 United Nations
 United Nations Association
 World Federation of United Nations Associations
 League of Nations Union

Footnotes

External links 
 United Nations Association of Sri Lanka (Official Website)
 United Nations Association of Sri Lanka (wiser.org)
 Two to represent UN Association at conference
 Healthy democracies need strong civil organizations(The Speech made by British High Commissioner in Colombo Dominick Chilcott at the National Observance Day of the 61st United Nations Association held at the BMICH on 15 October.)
 Speech to UN Association of Sri Lanka on the occasion of UN Day 2010
 Statement by UNRC to the United Nations Associations in marking UN Day 2013 in Colombo (2013 UN Day Celebration by the United Nations Association, Sri Lanka: Statement by the United Nations Resident Coordinator and UNDP Resident Representative in Sri Lanka, Mr. Mr. Subinay Nandy)
 68th United Nations Day observed
 Collaboration with United Nation Association of Sri Lanka (UNASL)
 REMARKS OF H.E. DEVINDA R. SUBASINGHE, AMBASSADOR OF SRI LANKA TO THE UNITED STATES OF AMERICA, TO THE UNITED NATIONS ASSOCIATION OF THE NATIONAL CAPITAL AREA, APRIL 22, 2004

Clubs and societies in Sri Lanka
Organizations established in 1949
World Federation of United Nations Associations